Patrick Bettoni (born 29 December 1975) is a Swiss-Italian former footballer who played as a goalkeeper. He last played for FC Thun in the Swiss Challenge League. He weighs 78 kg.

References

External links

football.ch

1975 births
Living people
Swiss men's footballers
FC Winterthur players
FC Baden players
L.R. Vicenza players
Ascoli Calcio 1898 F.C. players
A.C. Reggiana 1919 players
Neuchâtel Xamax FCS players
BSC Young Boys players
FC Thun players
Serie A players
Swiss Super League players
Swiss people of Italian descent
Swiss expatriate footballers
Swiss expatriate sportspeople in Italy
Expatriate footballers in Italy
Association football goalkeepers